The Hallam Football Club is an Australian rules football club located in  Hallam which participates in the Southern Football Netball League, based in the south and south eastern suburbs of Melbourne, Victoria.

History
The club was established in 2012, as a result of joining forces of the Hallam Junior Football Club and the Hallam Superules Football Club. In Hallam the club was accepted into the Southern Football League. The club commenced in 3rd Division and won three games in its first year and two games in its second.

An earlier club serving the area was the Narre Hallam Football Club, founded in 1953, which is based in Narre Warren and in 1989 renamed the Narre Warren Football Club.

References

External links
 Official website 

Australian rules football clubs in Melbourne
Southern Football League (Victoria)
2012 establishments in Australia
Australian rules football clubs established in 2012
Sport in the City of Casey